Thomas Vargish (born February 13, 1939) is an American scholar of literature. He was a professor of English at Dartmouth College.

Biography 
Vargish was born on February 13, 1939, in Fair Haven, Vermont. He received his B.A. from Columbia University in 1960. That year, he won a Rhodes Scholarship to study at Merton College, Oxford, and received his Ph.D. from Princeton University. Vargish's brother, Stephan Vargish, was also a Rhodes Scholar. He taught at Dartmouth College, University of Maryland, Baltimore County, University of Gothenburg, and the United States Air Force Academy.

Vargish earned a Guggenheim Fellowship in 1972 to work on a book on the religious background of Victorian fiction. He has also authored books on relativity and cubism with Dartmouth physicist Delo Mook, father of political strategist Robby Mook.

References 

1939 births
Columbia College (New York) alumni
Princeton University alumni
Dartmouth College faculty
University of Maryland, Baltimore County faculty
Academic staff of the University of Gothenburg
United States Air Force Academy faculty
People from Fair Haven, Vermont
Alumni of Merton College, Oxford
Living people